Bayram Qalehsi (also Romanized as Bāyrām Qal‘ehsī; also known as Bīrām Qal‘ehsī) is a village in Hulasu Rural District, in the Central District of Shahin Dezh County, West Azerbaijan Province, Iran. At the 2006 census, its population was 37, in 8 families.

References 

Populated places in Shahin Dezh County